Robert George "Red" Hamill (January 11, 1917 in Toronto, Ontario – December 16, 1985) was a professional ice hockey player who played 418 games in the National Hockey League.  He played for the Chicago Black Hawks and Boston Bruins. He won the Stanley Cup in 1939 with the Boston Bruins.

Although Hamill had played parts of two previous seasons in the NHL, he did not score his first NHL goal until his third season with the Boston Bruins.  It occurred on December 31, 1939 in his team's 6-1 victory over the Montreal Canadiens at Boston Garden. It was one of ten he would notch that season.

Career statistics

Regular season and playoffs

External links 
 

1917 births
1985 deaths
Boston Bruins players
Canadian ice hockey left wingers
Chicago Blackhawks captains
Chicago Blackhawks players
Hershey Bears players
Milwaukee Sea Gulls players
Ontario Hockey Association Senior A League (1890–1979) players
Providence Reds players
Ice hockey people from Toronto
Stanley Cup champions
Toronto Young Rangers players